The 1999 Swedish Touring Car Championship season was the 4th Swedish Touring Car Championship (STCC) season. It was decided over eight race weekends (comprising sixteen races) at six different circuits.

Mattias Ekström won his first championship for Kristofferson Motorsport.

Entry list

Race calendar and winners

Championship standings

Drivers' Championship
Points were awarded to the top ten drivers in a race as follows: 20, 15, 12, 10, 8, 6, 4, 3, 2, 1.
Each driver could drop their two worst results.
The final meeting of the year saw double points awarded.

Synsam Cup for Privateers

References

External links
touring-cars.net

Swedish Touring Car Championship seasons
Swedish Touring Car Championship
Swedish Touring Car Championship season